Unité Sainte-Rosienne is a football club in Guadeloupe, based in the town of Sainte-Rose.

Achievements
Guadeloupe Championnat National: 2
 2015–16, 2016–17.

Coupe de Guadeloupe: 1
 2012.

Performance in CFU competitions
CFU Club Championship: 1 appearance
2014 – First round

References

Sainte-Rose